Goldfields Way is a  country road in the northern part of the Riverina region of New South Wales, connecting Wyalong via Temora to Old Junee.

Route
Goldfields Way commences at the intersection with Newell Highway at Wyalong in the north and heads in a south-easterly direction before it intersects with Burley Griffin Way as it passes through the town of Temora. It continues in a southerly direction before it ends at an intersection with Olympic Highway at Old Junee.

History
The passing of the Main Roads Act of 1924 through the Parliament of New South Wales provided for the declaration of Main Roads, roads partially funded by the State government through the Main Roads Board (later the Department of Main Roads, and eventually Transport for NSW). Main Road No. 57 was declared along this road on 8 August 1928, from the intersection with Monaro Highway (today Sturt Highway) at Wagga Wagga, via Old Junee and Temora to Wyalong (and continuing northwards via Condobolin and Tullamore to the intersection with North-Western Highway, today Mitchell Highway, at Trangie). With the passing of the Main Roads (Amendment) Act of 1929 to provide for additional declarations of State Highways and Trunk Roads, this was amended to Trunk Road 57 on 8 April 1929.

The southern end of Trunk Road 57 was truncated just south of Old Junee when the declaration of Olympic Way (later named Olympic Highway) subsumed the former alignment on 19 June 1963.

The passing of the Roads Act of 1993 updated road classifications and the way they could be declared within New South Wales. Under this act, Goldfields Way today retains its declaration as part of Main Road 57, from Wyalong to Old Junee.

Goldfields Way was signed State Route 85 across its entire length in 1974. With the conversion to the newer alphanumeric system in 2013, this was replaced with route B85.

Major intersections

See also
 Highways in Australia
 Highways in New South Wales

References

Highways in New South Wales